Hayes Creek is  a river in the United States of America.

Hayes Creek  may also refer to.

Hayes Creek (British Columbia), a  water course in Canada
Hayes Creek, New Zealand, a populated place in Queenstown-Lakes District
Hayes Creek, a populated place in Northern Territories, Australia

See also
Hayes (disambiguation)